Gilda Live is a 1980 American comedy documentary film starring Gilda Radner, directed by Mike Nichols and produced by Lorne Michaels. Radner and Michaels and all of the writers involved with the production were alumni from the television program Saturday Night Live.

Summary

Gilda Live is a filmed version of the comedic one-woman show performance of Gilda Radner Live on Broadway. Originally titled Gilda Radner: Live from New York (renamed Gilda Live for the film debut), it had a steady success as a play but the movie itself and the record as well, both released in March 1980, were complete flops with critics and the public.  The Gilda Live movie was shot in Boston a few weeks before the start of Saturday Night Live'''s 5th season (late summer/early autumn of 1979). (It was decided not to film it in New York because of union problems.)  More footage for the film was shot at The Brooklyn Academy of Music in December 1979.  The film itself was basically a rehash of Radner's most popular Saturday Night Live characters and sketches.  It included Roseanne Roseannadanna, Emily Litella, Candy Slice, Judy Miller, Lisa Loopner, Nadia Comăneci, and Rhonda Weiss, and many other skits and performances such as "Let's Talk Dirty to the Animals" (which was a little more risque than the original TV version, as this version was the only scene that got the film an R rating), "I Love to Be Unhappy", "Goodbye Saccharine" and "Honey (Touch Me with My Clothes On)".  Skits were also performed by Don Novello as Father Guido Sarducci.  The tagline to the film was: "Things like this only happen in the movies."

VHS and DVD informationGilda Live'' has been released on VHS and was digitally remastered in 2000, and released on DVD through Warner Brothers' on-demand Warner Archive label on November 3, 2009.

References

External links
 

1980 films
American documentary films
American comedy films
Stand-up comedy concert films
Saturday Night Live films
Saturday Night Live in the 1980s
Films directed by Mike Nichols
Warner Bros. films
Films produced by Lorne Michaels
1980s English-language films
1980s American films